Le Corbusier's Furniture is a classic furniture line created by Le Corbusier.  The line was introduced in 1928 at the Salon d‘Autumne in Paris.

History
Le Corbusier began experimenting with furniture design in 1928 after seeing a model apartment designed by the architect Charlotte Perriand and inviting her to join his studio. His cousin, Pierre Jeanneret, also collaborated on many of the designs. Before the arrival of Perriand, Le Corbusier relied on ready-made furniture to furnish his projects, such as the simple pieces manufactured by Thonet, the company that manufactured his designs in the 1930s.

Conceptualization
In 1928, Le Corbusier and Perriand began to put the expectations for furniture Le Corbusier outlined in his 1925 book L'Art Décoratif d'aujourd'hui into practice. In the book he defined three different furniture types: type-needs, type-furniture, and human-limb objects.

He defined human-limb objects as: "Extensions of our limbs and adapted to human functions that are type-needs and type-functions, therefore type-objects and type-furniture. The human-limb object is a docile servant. A good servant is discreet and self-effacing in order to leave his master free. Certainly, works of art are tools, beautiful tools. And long live the good taste manifested by choice, subtlety, proportion, and harmony".

Products
The first results of the collaboration were three chrome-plated tubular steel chairs designed for two of his projects, The Maison la Roche in Paris and a pavilion for Barbara and Henry Church. The line of furniture was expanded for Le Corbusier's 1929 Salon d'Automne installation, 'Equipment for the Home'.

These chairs included the LC-1, LC-2, LC-3, and LC-4, originally titled "Basculant" (LC-1), "Fauteuil grand confort, petit modèle" (LC-2, "great comfort sofa, small model"), "Fauteuil grand confort, grand modèle" (LC-3, "great comfort sofa, large model"), and "Chaise longue" (LC-4, "Long chair"). The LC-2 was featured in the Maxell "blown away" advertisement.

List of Furniture items
 LC1 - Sling Chair, originally titled Basculant
 LC2 - Grand confort, petit modèle referred as Cushion Baskets (1928)
 LC3 - Grand confort, grand modèle referred as Cushion Baskets (1928)
 LC4 - Chaise longue "Long chair"
 LC5 - Sofa Bed
 LC5.F - Canapé
 LC6 - Table
 LC7 - The Swivel Chair (1928)
 LC8 - Swivel Stool
 LC9 - Bathroom Stool
 LC10 P - Rectangular Low Table
 LC11 P - Table
 LC12 - Table designed in 1925 for Villa La Roche
 LC13 - Fauteuil Wagon Fumoir
 LC14 - Tabouret (1952 - 1959) (Tabouret LC14.01, Tabouret LC14.02)
 LC15 - Table De Conférence
 LC16 - Table De Travail Avec Rayonnages
 LC17 - Portemantea (1957)
 LC19 - Table Esprit Nouveau

Wooden
 Authentic wood design

References

External links
For a contrast between the LC2 and Gray's Bibendum chair

Le Corbusier
Furniture designers
Products introduced in 1928
1928 in art
Individual models of furniture